Khuzhir (Khujar) is a rural locality (an ulus) in Zakamensky District, Republic of Buryatia, Russia. The population was 357 as of 2010. There are 7 streets.

Geography 
Khuzhir is located 16 km north of Zakamensk (the district's administrative centre) by road. Zakamensk is the nearest rural locality.

References 

Rural localities in Zakamensky District